Lake and Peninsula Borough (Leyk-end-Peninsula) is a borough in the state of Alaska. As of the 2020 census, the population was 1,476, down from 1,631 in 2010. The borough seat of King Salmon is located in neighboring Bristol Bay Borough, although is not the seat of that borough. The most populous community in the borough is the census-designated place of Port Alsworth. With an average of 0.017 inhabitants/km2 (0.045/sq mi), the Lake and Peninsula Borough is the second least densely populated organized county-equivalent in the United States; only the unorganized Yukon-Koyukuk Census Area has a lower density.

Geography

The borough contains Iliamna Lake, the largest lake in Alaska and third largest within United States borders, and occupies most of the Alaska Peninsula. Its land area is larger than that of San Bernardino County, California, the largest county in the contiguous Lower 48 states, and slightly larger than the state of South Carolina.

Adjacent boroughs and census areas
 Bethel Census Area, Alaska – north
 Kenai Peninsula Borough, Alaska – east
 Kodiak Island Borough, Alaska – southeast
 Aleutians East Borough, Alaska – west
 Bristol Bay Borough, Alaska – west
 Dillingham Census Area, Alaska – west

National protected areas
 Alagnak Wild River
 Alaska Maritime National Wildlife Refuge (part of the Alaska Peninsula unit)
 Sutwik Island
 Alaska Peninsula National Wildlife Refuge (part)
 Aniakchak National Monument and Preserve
 Becharof National Wildlife Refuge (part)
 Becharof Wilderness (part)
 Katmai National Park and Preserve (part)
 Katmai Wilderness (part)
 Lake Clark National Park and Preserve (part)
 Lake Clark Wilderness (part)

Demographics

As of the census of 2000, there were 1,823 people, 588 households, and 418 families residing in the borough.  The population density was 0.059 people per square mile (0.023/km2).  There were 1,557 housing units at an average density of 0.05 per square mile (0.02/km2).  The racial makeup of the borough was 18.76% White, 0.05% Black or African American, 73.51% Native American, 0.22% Asian, 0.16% Pacific Islander, 0.33% from other races, and 6.97% from two or more races.  1.15% of the population were Hispanic or Latino of any race. About 5.41% reported speaking a Yupik language at home, while 3.87% speak Alutiiq and 1.23% an Athabaskan language .

Some 44.70% of households had children under the age of 18 living with them, 48.50% were married couples living together, 9.70% had a female householder with no husband present, and 28.90% were non-families. About 24.70% of all households were made up of individuals, and 3.90% consisted of a sole occupant 65 years of age or older.  The average household size was 3.10 and the average family size was 3.74.

In the borough, the age of the population was spread out, with 37.80% under the age of 18, 8.50% from 18 to 24, 28.00% from 25 to 44, 20.20% from 45 to 64, and 5.40% who were 65 years of age or older.  The median age was 29 years. For every 100 females, there were 113.50 males.  For every 100 females age 18 and over, there were 124.10 males.

The dominant religion is Orthodox Christianity.

Government
The Borough is governed by an elected assembly. The Borough's mayor is Glen R. Alsworth, Sr. The deputy mayor is Myra J. Olsen. The other members of the assembly are Randy Alvarez, Scott Anderson, Alvin Pedersen, Michelle Pope-Ravenmoon, and Christina Salmon-Bringhurst.

Communities

Cities
Chignik
Egegik
Newhalen
Nondalton
Pilot Point
Port Heiden

Census-designated places

Chignik Lagoon
Chignik Lake
Igiugig
Iliamna
Ivanof Bay
Kokhanok
Levelock
Pedro Bay
Perryville
Pope-Vannoy Landing
Port Alsworth
Ugashik

Ghost town
Kijik

See also

List of airports in the Lake and Peninsula Borough

References

External links
 

 Borough map: Alaska Department of Labor

 
Alaska boroughs
Bering Sea
1989 establishments in Alaska
Populated places established in 1989